Yonggary may refer to:

 Yongary, Monster from the Deep, a 1967 science fiction film
 Yonggary (character), a giant monster originating from the film
 Yonggary (1999 film), a South Korean monster film